Joe Fleming (born December 5, 1971) is a former Canadian Football League defensive end. Over his ten years in the CFL he played for three teams and did not play during the 2002 CFL season.

Fleming announced his retirement prior to the 2006 CFL football season.

High School Years
Fleming attended Xaverian Brothers High School in Westwood, Massachusetts, and was a star in both football and hockey, along with being a top student. In football, he was a Boston Globe and a Quincy Patriot Ledger All-Scholastic Choice while playing at the University of New Hampshire. In ice hockey he was selected in the twelfth round of the 1990 NHL Entry Draft by the St. Louis Blues.

Notes 

1971 births
American players of Canadian football
BC Lions players
Calgary Stampeders players
Canadian football defensive linemen
Canadian Football League Most Outstanding Defensive Player Award winners
Living people
New Hampshire Wildcats football players
People from Wellesley, Massachusetts
St. Louis Blues draft picks
Winnipeg Blue Bombers players
Xaverian Brothers High School alumni
Ice hockey players from Massachusetts
Players of American football from Massachusetts